These are the full results of the 2001 South American Championships in Athletics which took place on May 18–20, 2001, in Manaus, Brazil.

Men's results

100 meters

Heats – May 18Wind:Heat 1: +0.2 m/s, Heat 2: +0.2 m/s

Final – May 18Wind:+0.2 m/s

200 meters

Heats – May 20Wind:Heat 1: +0.1 m/s, Heat 2: +0.3 m/s

Final – May 20Wind:0.0 m/s

400 meters
May 19

800 meters
May 18

1500 meters
May 20

5000 meters
May 19

10,000 meters
May 20

110 meters hurdles
May 19Wind: 0.0 m/s

400 meters hurdles
May 18

3000 meters steeplechase
May 19

4 x 100 meters relay
May 19

4 x 400 meters relay
May 20

20,000 meters walk
May 19

High jump
May 18

Pole vault
May 20

Long jump
May 19

Triple jump
May 20

Shot put
May 19

Discus throw
May 20

Hammer throw
May 20

Javelin throw
May 18

Decathlon
May 18–19

Women's results

100 meters
May 18Wind: +0.6 m/s

200 meters
May 20Wind: 0.0 m/s

400 meters
May 19

800 meters
May 18

1500 meters
May 20

5000 meters
May 19

10,000 meters
May 19

100 meters hurdles
May 20Wind: +0.1 m/s

400 meters hurdles
May 18

3000 meters steeplechase
May 20

4 x 100 meters relay
May 19

4 x 400 meters relay
May 20

20,000 meters walk
May 18

High jump
May 19

Pole vault
May 18

Long jump
May 18

Triple jump
May 19

Shot put
May 18

Discus throw
May 19

Hammer throw
May 19

Javelin throw
May 18

Heptathlon
May 19–20

References

South American Championships
Events at the South American Championships in Athletics